Petro Bolbochan (October 5, 1883, Yarivka village (Romanian: Hâjdeul de Sus), now Dnistrovskyi Raion, Chernivtsi Oblast - June 28, 1919, Balyn village, now Kamianets-Podilskyi Raion, Khmelnytskyi Oblast) was a Ukrainian military figure of Romanian origins, colonel of the UPR Army, leader of the Crimean operation against the Bolsheviks to establishment of Ukrainian power on the territory of the peninsula and taking control of the Black Sea Fleet. From November 1918 to January 1919, Bolbochan headed the Defense of Northeastern Ukraine.

Biography 
Petro Fedorovich Bolbochan was born on October 5 (17), 1883  in the village of Yarivka(Romanian: Hâjdeul de Sus), Khotyn district, Bessarabia Governorate (now Yarivka village, Dnistrovskyi Raion, Chernivtsi Oblast) in the family of a Romanian Orthodox priest, Fedor Alekseevich Bolbochan. Father —  also from the family of a priest, was born in the village. Lipnik, Sorokin district Governorate, Bessarabian Governorate.

In 1905 he graduated from the Chisinau Theological Seminary.

In 1909 he graduated from the Chuguiv Infantry Junker School.

During the First World War he was an officer of the 38th Tobolsk Regiment.

Ukrainian People's Army 
After the revolution, Bolbochan actively began organizing Ukrainian military units and helped form the 1st Bohdan Khmelnytsky Ukrainian Regiment from Russian army units. On November 22, 1917, Peter Bolbochan was appointed commander of the regiment. In early December 1918 the 1st Ukrainian Regiment was liquidated by order of the Bolsheviks. Despite Bolbochan's resistance, the regiment was disarmed and the barracks blown up, killing a number of soldiers. In January 1918 Bolbochan created a new military formation that became the 2nd Zaporizhzhya infantry hut, later regiment. On March 2, 1918, the 2nd Zaporizhzhya regiment, led by Petro Bolbochan, was the first to enter Kyiv, ahead of the  German imperial army, and took control of the city without Bolshevik resistance. The Zaporozhians then took control of Hrebinka, Lubny, Romodan, and Poltava.

From November 1918 to January 1919, Bolbochan headed the Defense of Northeastern Ukraine.

Bolbochan was arrested for criticizing the inconsistent policies of the Ukrainian People's Republic government, convicted by a court-martial, and shot. At the time of sentencing, he was 35 years old.

A bust of Bolbochan was unveiled on the Petro Bolbochan Square at 86 Sichovykh Striltsiv Street in Kyiv's Shevchenkivskyi District on 5 October 2020. This is the first monumental sculpture in his honor in Ukraine and the world.

References 

Executed military personnel
Ukrainian military leaders
Imperial Russian Army personnel
Recipients of the Order of Saint Stanislaus (Russian), 3rd class
Recipients of the Order of Saint Stanislaus (Russian), 2nd class
Ukrainian people of Romanian descent
Recipients of the Order of St. Anna, 4th class
Recipients of the Order of St. Anna, 3rd class
Recipients of the Order of St. Anna, 2nd class
1919 deaths
1883 births